Mauricio Martínez (born May 23, 1978, in Monterrey, NL) is a Mexican actor and singer best known for participating in the Broadway musical On Your Feet!, in the Emmy Winning TV Show El Vato NBC , the hit Señora Acero Telemundo and several Mexican telenovelas.

Personal life 
In 2010 Mauricio was diagnosed with bladder cancer and has had 3 recurrences until 2018. In 2014 the actor confirmed to be gay and was married to Mexican publicist Emilio Solís from 2013 up until their divorce in 2015. He currently lives in New York City.

Filmography

Broadway

Films

Television 

|2017–18 || El Vato || Marcos Gutierrez ||

References

External links 

1978 births
Living people
Mexican male film actors
Mexican male telenovela actors
Male actors from Monterrey
21st-century Mexican male actors
Mexican gay actors
Mexican gay musicians
Mexican LGBT singers
Gay singers
Operación Triunfo contestants